The Geelvink fruit dove (Ptilinopus speciosus) is a species of bird in the family Columbidae. It is native to several islands, including Biak, Supiori, Numfor, and the smaller Padaido Islands, collectively known as the Schouten or Geelvink Islands, which lie north of New Guinea.

Its natural habitat is tropical moist lowland forests. It is also found in the islands' degraded former forests.

The Geelvink fruit dove was formerly considered conspecific with the yellow-bibbed fruit dove (P. solomonensis), but was recognized as a distinct species by the IOC in 2021.

References

Ptilinopus
Birds of the Schouten Islands
Birds described in 1871
Taxa named by Hermann Schlegel
Endemic fauna of the Biak–Numfoor rain forests